Johannes Bitter (born 2 September 1982) is a German handball goalkeeper for HSV Hamburg.

Club career
Bitter started his senior career with SG VTB Altjührden in 1999, before moving to Wilhelmshavener HV three years later. After only one season in Wilhelmshaven, he signed with SC Magdeburg in 2003, with whom he won the EHF Cup. Following that success, Bitter eventually moved to HSV Hamburg in the summer of 2007. In 2016 Bitter moved from Hamburg to TVB 1898 Stuttgart. There, he has extended his contract by one year to stay with the club until 30 June 2018.

International career
Bitter made his debut for the German national team on 4 January 2002 in Balingen against Switzerland.
He is World champion from 2007 with Germany. He participated on the German team that finished 4th at the 2008 European Men's Handball Championship. Bitter represented Germany at the 2008 Summer Olympics in Beijing, China.

After the 2020 Summer Olympics, he announced that he would not be participating in the national team again unless there was an emergency. At the 2022 European Championship he participated again, for the last time.

References

External links

1982 births
Living people
German male handball players
Handball players at the 2008 Summer Olympics
Olympic handball players of Germany
Sportspeople from Hamburg
Handball-Bundesliga players
Handball players at the 2020 Summer Olympics
SC Magdeburg players